Chorba frik (Arabic: شربة فريك) is a traditional Algerian soup that is made with lamb or beef, vegetables, and a unique ingredient called frik. Frik is a type of wheat that has been harvested while still green and then roasted and rubbed to remove the outer husk. The resulting grain is then dried and can be stored for later use. To make chorba frik, the meat is first browned in a pot with onions and garlic, and then water is added along with the vegetables, which often include carrots, celery, tomatoes, and chickpeas. Frik is added to the pot and simmered with the other ingredients until the soup is thick and flavorful. Various spices and herbs such as turmeric, cumin, coriander, and mint are added to give the soup its distinctive flavor. Chorba frik is a hearty and nutritious soup that is popular in Algeria, particularly during the winter months and especially during Ramadan. It is often served with bread on the side and is considered a staple of Algerian cuisine.

References 

Algerian soups

Algerian cuisine